The Polish Navy (often abbreviated to Marynarka) is  the naval branch of the Polish Armed Forces. The Polish Navy consists of 46 ships and about 12,000 commissioned and enlisted personnel. The traditional ship prefix in the Polish Navy is ORP (Okręt Rzeczypospolitej Polskiej, "Warship of the Republic of Poland").

Origins

The Polish Navy has its roots in naval vessels that were largely employed on Poland's main rivers in defense of trade and commerce. During the Thirteen Years' War (1454–66), a small force of ships that primarily operated on rivers and lakes saw real open sea battles for the first time. At the Battle of Vistula Lagoon, a combined fleet of the Kingdom of Poland and the pro-Polish Prussian Confederation decisively defeated the navy of the Teutonic Knights, and secured permanent access to the Baltic Sea. In 1454, the maritime city of Gdańsk was re-incorporated to Poland after being previously occupied by the Teutonic Knights since 1308. The reintegration was confirmed in the Second Peace of Thorn (1466), and Poland acquired the means of maintaining a large fleet on the Baltic. In 1561, following a victory over a Russian fleet in the Baltic, the Polish Navy acquired a second key port at Riga, in modern-day Latvia.

At that time, as the Kingdom of Poland and the Grand Duchy of Lithuania (Polish–Lithuanian union) became involved in conflicts in Livonia, Polish king Sigismund II Augustus organized a Sea Commission (Komisja Morska) which operated between 1568 and 1572, and supported the operations of Polish privateers, but that met with opposition of the Poland's primary port, Gdańsk, which saw them as a threat to its trade operations (see Hanseatic League). This led to the development of a privateer port in Puck. Around the start of the 17th century, Poland became ruled by the House of Vasa, and was involved in a series of wars with Sweden (see also dominium maris baltici). The Polish kings of the period attempted to create a proper naval fleet, but their attempts met with repeated failures, due to lack of funds in the royal treasury (Polish nobility saw little need for the fleet and refused to raise taxes for its construction, and Gdańsk continued its opposition to the idea of a royal fleet). During the reign of Sigismund III of Poland, the most celebrated victory of the Commonwealth Navy took place at the Battle of Oliwa in 1627 against the Swedish Empire, during the Polish–Swedish War. The victory over the Swedish fleet secured for Poland permanent access to the Baltic, and laid the foundations for potential expeditions beyond Europe. The plans for the permanent naval fleet fell through shortly afterwards due to a badly executed alliance with the Habsburgs who in 1629 forcibly took over the fleet.

The Commission of Royal Ships (Komisja Okrętów Królewskich) was created in 1625. This commission, along with the ultimate allocation of funds by the Sejm in 1637, created a permanent Commonwealth Navy. Władysław IV Vasa, Sigismund's son and successor who took the throne in 1632, purchased 12 ships and built a dedicated port for the royal navy called Władysławowo. The fleet, however, was entirely destroyed in 1637 by Denmark-Norway, despite the Danish not issuing a formal declaration of war. Support for the idea of a Polish-Lithuanian navy was weak and it largely withered away by the 1640s; the remaining ships were sold in the years 1641–1643, which marked the end of the Commonwealth Navy. A small navy was also created by Augustus II the Strong in 1700 during the Great Northern War. The Polish–Lithuanian Commonwealth, though the dominant force in Central and Eastern Europe during the 16th–18th centuries, never developed its navy to its full potential. The proportionally small Polish coastline and the limited access to the Atlantic never allowed for a massive buildup of naval forces to the level of maritime great powers such as the Kingdom of Great Britain and the Kingdom of France. The Partitions of Poland at the end of the 18th century brought an end to the possibility of an independent Polish Navy.

20th century

Following World War I, the Second Polish Republic on 28 November 1918, by the order of Józef Piłsudski, commander of the Armed Forces of Poland, founded the modern Polish Navy. The small naval force was placed under the command of Captain Bogumił Nowotny as its first chief. The first ships, which included several torpedo boats, were acquired from the former Imperial German Navy. In the 1920s and 1930s the Polish Navy underwent a modernisation program under the leadership of Vice-Admiral Jerzy Świrski (Chief of Naval Staff) and Rear-Admiral Józef Unrug (CO of the Fleet).

A number of modern ships were built in France, the Netherlands, and the United Kingdom. Despite ambitious plans (including 2 cruisers and 12 destroyers), the budgetary limitations placed on the government by the Great Depression never allowed the navy to expand beyond a small Baltic force. The building of one submarine, was partly funded by a public collection. One of the main goals of the Polish Navy was to protect the Polish coast against the Soviet Baltic Fleet, therefore it put emphasis on fast submarines, large and heavily armed destroyers and mine warfare. By September 1939 the Polish Navy consisted of 5 submarines, 4 destroyers, 1 big minelayer and various smaller support vessels and mine-warfare ships. This force was no match for the larger Kriegsmarine, and so a strategy of harassment and indirect engagement was implemented.

World War II

The outbreak of World War II caught the Polish Navy in a state of expansion. Lacking numerical superiority, Polish Naval commanders decided to withdraw main surface ships to Great Britain to join the Allied war effort and prevent them from being destroyed in a closed Baltic (the Peking Plan). On 30 August 1939, three destroyers, (and ) sailed to the British naval base at Leith in Scotland. They then operated in combination with Royal Navy vessels against Germany. Also two submarines managed to flee from the Baltic Sea through the Danish straits to Great Britain during the Polish September Campaign (one of them, made a daring escape from internment in Tallinn, Estonia, and traveled without charts). Three submarines were interned in Sweden, while remaining surface vessels were sunk by German aircraft.

During the war the Polish Navy in exile was supplemented with leased British ships, including two cruisers (HMS Danae/ORP Conrad, and HMS Dragon/ORP Dragon), seven destroyers, three submarines, and a number of smaller fast-attack vessels. During the course of the war, one cruiser, four destroyers, one minelayer, one torpedo boat, two submarines and some smaller vessels (gunboats, mine hunters etc.) were sunk; in total, twenty-six ships were lost, mostly in September 1939. In addition to participating in the sinking of Bismarck, the Polish Navy sank an enemy destroyer and six other surface ships, two submarines and a number of merchant vessels.

Postwar

After World War II, on 7 July 1945, the new Soviet-imposed Communist government revived the Polish Navy with headquarters in Gdynia. During the Communist period, Poland's navy experienced a great buildup, including the development of a separate amphibious force of Polish Marines. The Navy also acquired a number of Soviet-made ships, including 2 destroyers, 2 missile destroyers, 13 submarines and 17 missile boats. Polish shipyards produced mostly landing craft, minesweepers and auxiliary vessels. The primary role of the Warsaw Pact Polish Navy was to be Baltic Sea control, as well as amphibious operations along the entire Baltic coastline against NATO forces in Denmark and West Germany. The collapse of the Soviet Union, the dissolution of the Warsaw Pact, and the fall of Communism ended this stance.

21st century

Poland's entrance into the North Atlantic Treaty Organization has greatly changed the structure and role of the Polish Navy. Whereas before, most of Naval High Command was concerned with coastal defense and Baltic Sea Operations, the current mindset is for integration with international naval operations. To facilitate these changes the Republic of Poland undertook a number of modernization programs aimed at creating a force capable of power projection. This included the acquisition of two s from the United States. The Naval air arm has also acquired a number of SH-2G Super Seasprite helicopters. The Polish Navy continues to operate one Kilo-class attack submarine.

The Polish Navy has taken part in numerous joint force operations. In 1999 the naval base at Gdynia became the home base of all NATO submarine forces in the Baltic, codenamed "Cooperative Poseidon". That same year joint American-Polish submarine training manoeuvres codenamed "Baltic Porpoise" for the first time utilized the port in a multinational military exercise.

Modernization

As of the 2020s, the Polish Navy is modernizing its fleet. The work was initially planned as a 9 billion zloty project, but this was reduced in 2012 to 5 billion zloty, causing delays and cancellations in the succeeding years. The navy's 2017 strategy called for spending 13 billion zloty and acquiring 22 new warships, including those completed since 2013. In addition, although the force considers larger warships unsuitable for the confines of the Baltic Sea, the strategy called for extending the operational lifespan of one Oliver Hazard Perry-class frigate.

12 new ships worth around 10 billion PLN were to be acquired before 2026. The plan was updated in 2017 for 2013–2022 period to be worth 13 billion zloty and called to acquire 22 new vessels. These included three coast-defense vessels, code name Miecznik, that would feature a displacement of 2600 tons; and three patrol/mine countermeasure vessels, code name Czapla with 1700 tons displacement. Other purchases include six tugboats, two tankers, two rescue ships, one ELINT, one logistical support ship and one Joint Support Ship. However some deliveries are expected up to 2026. On 2 July 2015,  was christened during official launching ceremony, becoming the first new Polish-built Navy ship in 21 years. In 2022, UK shipbuilder Babcock announced that the Polish Navy had selected its Arrowhead 140 design for its Miecznik program, which will equip the navy with three new-build multi-mission frigates. The vessels are expected to be built locally in Poland.

In terms of armament, the Polish Navy has acquired 36 Swedish RBS15 Mk3. and 50 (50/74) Norwegian Naval Strike Missiles for vessels and coastal defence units. , t is planned to reinforce the Navy's helicopter fleet with four to eight ASW/SAR units. The s program was cancelled with the sole surviving unit to be built as a patrol vessel. In June 2013 the Coastal Missile Division (NDR) equipped initially with 12 Naval Strike Missiles and two TRS-15C radars achieved initial readiness.

Mission and organization
The main mission of the Polish Navy is the defense of Poland's territorial waters, coastline and its interests abroad. Other missions include the support of NATO allied operations, and search and rescue operations throughout the Baltic Sea. In addition, the Polish Navy supplies nearly 40 ships as part of the NATO Rapid Reaction Force, designed to be a force projection and conflict response force around the world. The Polish Navy is organized into 2 separate Flotillas and a Naval Air Brigade. Until January 1, 2014 the service had a Chief of the Navy (a three-star Admirał floty) and a Naval Command. On that date the branch-specific Land Forces, Air Forces, Naval and Special Forces Commands were disestablished and combined into two new commands. The functions of the three-star Chief of the Navy were split between two two-star officers (vice-admirals in the Polish system of military ranks) - an Inspector of the Navy under the Armed Forces General Command, responsible for manpower, materiel and combat readiness and a Commander of the Seaborne Component Command, responsible for naval operations.

 Armed Forces Operational Command in Warsaw
 Seaborne Operations Center - Seaborne Component Command in Gdynia
 Armed Forces General Command in Warsaw
 Inspector of the Navy in Warsaw
 3rd Ship Flotilla "Commodore Bolesław Romanowski" in Gdynia-Oksywie
 Flotilla Command
 Submarine Ships Division in Gdynia-Oksywie
 ORP 291 Orzeł - Kilo-class submarine
 Gdynia Combatant Ships Division - Gdynia-Oksywie
 ORP 272 Generał Kazimierz Pułaski and ORP 273 Generał Tadeusz Kościuszko - Oliver Hazard Perry-class frigates
 ORP 421 Orkan, ORP 422 Piorun and ORP 423 Grom - Orkan-class missile corvettes
 ORP 240 Kaszub - single ship ASW corvette Project 620
 ORP 241 Ślązak - single ship multirole corvette Project Meko A-100, being fitted out until the end of 2018
 Support Ships Division in Gdynia
 ORP 251 Wodnik - single ship Wodnik-class training vessel Project 888
 ORP 281 Piast and ORP 282 Lech - Piast-class rescue-salvage ships Project 570
 ORP R-14 Zbyszko and ORP R-15 Maćko - rescue cutters Project B823
 Reconnaissance Ships Group in Gdynia
 ORP 262 Nawigator and ORP 263 Hydrograf - Nawigator-class reconnaissance ships
 Hydrographic Support Squadron in Gdynia
 ORP 265 Heweliusz and ORP 266 Arctowski - Heweliusz-class hydrographic survey ships
 ORP 253 Iskra - Iskra-class sail training ship
 2 hydrographic cutters K-4 and K-10 and 3 hydrographic motor launches M-38, M-39 and M-40
 Coastal ASM Unit "Commodore Zbigniew Przybyszewski" in Siemirowice
 1st Coastal ASM Division - Naval Strike Missile
 2nd Coastal ASM Division - Naval Strike Missile
 9th Anti-Aircraft Division in Ustka - Grom MANPADS and S-60 AAA guns
 43rd Naval Combat Engineer Battalion in Rozewie
 Naval Technical Base in Gdynia
 Military Port Command "Brig. Gen. Stanisław Dąbek" in Gdynia
 Base Location Hel
 Naval Sailing Training Center in Gdynia
 Naval Control and Measurement Range in Gdynia-Oksywie
 ORP H34 Błyskawica - Grom-class destroyer museum ship
 8th Coastal Defense Flotilla "Vice admiral Kazimierz Porębski" in Świnoujście
 Flotilla Command
 2nd Landing and Minelaying Ships Division in Swinoujscie
 ORP 821 Lublin, ORP 822 Gniezno, ORP 823 Kraków, ORP 824 Poznań and ORP 825 Toruń - Lublin-class minelayer-landing ships
 ORP 511 Kontradmirał Xawery Czernicki - multirole support ship
 3 landing cutters Project 716
 12th Wolin Minesweeper Division in Swinoujscie
 ORP 631 Gardno, ORP 632 Bukowo, ORP 633 Dąbie, ORP 634 Jamno, ORP 635 Mielno, ORP 636 Wicko, ORP 637 Resko, ORP 638 Sarbsko, ORP 639 Necko, ORP 640 Nakło, ORP 641 Drużno, ORP 642 Hańcza - Gardno-class minesweepers Project 207P
 TR-25 and TR-26 - minesweeping cutters Project B410-IVS
 EOD Diver Group
 13th Minesweeper Division "Fleet Admiral Andrzej Karweta" in Gdynia
 ORP 624 Czajka - minehunter Project 206FM
 ORP 601 Kormoran - minehunter Project 258
 ORP 630 Gopło, ORP 643 Mamry, ORP 644 Wigry, ORP 645 Śniardwy, ORP 646 Wdzydze - coastal minesweepers Project 207M
 EOD Diver Group
 8th Anti-Aircraft Division in Dziwnów - Grom MANPADS, ZU-23-2 and S-60 AAA guns
 8th Kołobrzeg Naval Combat Engineer Battalion in Dziwnów
 Military Port Command Swinoujscie
 Base Location Kołobrzeg
 Gdynia Naval Aviation Brigade "Commander Pilot Karol Trzask-Durski" in Gdynia-Babie Doły
 Brigade Command
 43rd Oksywie Naval Air Base "Commander Edward Stanisław Szystowiski" in Gdynia-Babie Doły
 Air Group
 4 transport aircraft An-28TD (0703 and 1003) and M28B (1117 and 1118)
 4 shipborne ASW helicopters Kaman SH-2G Super Seasprite (3543, 3544, 3545 and 3546)
 6 SAR helicopters W-3WARM Anakonda (0505, 0506, 0511, 0813, 0815 and 0906)
 2 training and liaison helicopters Mi-2D (5245) and Mi-2R (5348)
 44th Kaszubian-Darłowo Naval Air Base in Siemirowice
 Kaszubian Air Group in Siemirowice
 7 maritime patrol aircraft M28B-1R Bryza M28B-1R (1006, 1008, 1017, 1022, 1114, 1115 and 1116)
 1 maritime patrol and submarine detection aircraft M28B-1RM/BIS Bryza (0810)
 2 environmental monitoring aircraft An-28E (0404 and 0405)
 Darłowo Air Group in Darłowo
 2 SAR helicopters Mi-14PŁ/R (1009 and 1012)
 8 ASW helicopters Mi-14PŁ (1001, 1003, 1004, 1005, 1007, 1008, 1010 and 1011)
 2 SAR helicopters W-3WARM Anakonda (0209 and 0304)
 2 training and liaison helicopters Mi-2R (5828 and 5830)
 Naval Hydrographical Bureau in Gdynia
 6th Oliwa Radioelectronic Reconnaissance Regiment ″Admiral Arendt Dickmann″
 Naval Training Center "Vice Admiral Józef Unrug" in Ustka
 Naval NCO School in Ustka
 Diving and Deep Diving Training Center of the Polish Armed Forces "Commodore Stanisław Mielczarek" in Gdynia

Ranks and insignia

Officers

Other ranks

Equipment

Ships 

Currently, the Polish Navy operates 48 ships, including: 3 submarines, 2 frigates, 2 corvettes, 3 fast-attack craft, 21 mine destroyers, 5 mine layers, 4 salvage ships, 6 auxiliary ships and 2 training vessels. Also, the navy operates 40 naval aircraft, including 10 maritime patrol planes, 4 transport planes, 10 search air-rescue helicopters, 12 anti-submarine warfare helicopters, 4 transport & training helicopters.
The Polish Ministry of Defence has additionally started multiple programs to modernise and revive the Polish Navy such as the Miecznik programme, the Kormoran class minesweepers, the Orka submarine program and many more.

Aircraft

Coastal Defense

See also
 List of Polish admirals
 Polish contribution to World War II (Navy)
 Polish Navy order of battle in 1939
 Polish Merchant Navy
 Polish Border Guard Vessels

References

Bibliography
 
 Peszke, Michael Alfred, Poland's Navy: 1918–1945, New York, Hippocrene Books, 1999, .

External links
 Official Marynarka Wojenna homepage
 A history of the navy to 1945
 Polish Navy Homepage 1939–1947